The Hacı Beşir Ağa Mosque, located in Istanbul's Fatih district, was built in 1745. The design of the mosque can be described as baroque.

References 

Religious buildings and structures completed in 1745
Ottoman mosques in Istanbul
Fatih
18th-century mosques